Saint Stephen of Piperi (died May 20, 1697) is a Saint of the Serbian Orthodox Church.

He was born into the Nikšić clan in the village of Kuti in Župa of poor but devout parents, Radoje and Jaćima Krulanović. According to tradition, he first lived a life of asceticism in the Morača monastery where he was abbot. The Turks drove him out of Morača and he settled in Rovacki, Turmanj in the place which today is called Celište. In 1660 he settled in Piperi in a cell where he remained in labor and asceticism until his death. He died peacefully on May 20, 1697. His relics still repose there and are claimed to produce miracles. His feast day is celebrated on the anniversary of his repose, on May 20.

References

1697 deaths
17th-century Serbian people
17th-century births
Serbian Orthodox clergy
Serbian saints of the Eastern Orthodox Church